Tihar (also known as Deepawali and Yamapanchak) is a five-day Hindu festival celebrated in Nepal and the Indian states of Sikkim and West Bengal, particularly the towns of Darjeeling and Kalimpong, which host a large number of ethnic Indian Gorkha people. Tihar is analogous to the Indian festival of Diwali, the festival of lights, but some significant differences.

Like with Diwali, Tihar is marked by lighting diyo inside and outside the home but unlike the Indian festival, the five days of Tihar include celebration and worship of the four creatures associated with the Hindu god of death Yama, with the final day reserved for people themselves. According to the Vikram Samvat calendar, the festival begins with Kaag (crow) Tihar on Trayodashi tithi of Kārtika kṛṣṇa pakṣa (the 13th day of the waning moon) and ends with Bhai Tika on Dwitiya tithi  of Kārtika śukla pakṣa every year. In the Gregorian calendar, the festival falls sometime between October and November every year.

Celebration 
Nepal's various communities celebrate Tihar in different ways. The festival is popularly known as Swanti among the Newars and as Deepawali among Madhesis. Nepalis also make patterns on the floors of living rooms or courtyards using materials such as colored rice, dry flour, colored sand or flower petals, called Rangoli, as a sacred welcoming for the gods and goddesses, particularly Lakshmi. 

Firecrackers are often set off during the festival, although the Nepal government has placed a ban on the use of firecrackers in recent years citing increasing cases of injury. 

Children also go from house to house, singing songs and asking for gifts in the form of money and foodstuff. 

Gambling in the form of cards, kauda (a game of cowrie shells), or langur burja are popular pastimes during the festival.

Tihar is the second biggest Nepali festival after Dashain, and is usually allocated a three-day-long national holiday. The festival is considered novel in that it shows reverence to not just the gods, but also to animals such as crows, cows, and dogs that have long-lived alongside humans.

Kaag Tihar (Day 1)

The first day of Tihar is called Kaag (crow) Tihar. Crows and ravens, believed to be the messengers of the death god Yama, are worshipped with offerings of grains, seeds, and sweets placed on the roofs or out on the streets. The cawing of crows and ravens is associated with sadness and grief in Hinduism as these birds are believed to carry messages from Yama. By feeding the crows, devotees hope to appease them and ward off death and grief for the coming year.

Alongside Kaag Tihar, Dhanteras (also known as Dhan Trayodashi and Dhanwantari Jayanti) is also observed on this day. Dhanvantari, the Hindu god of medicine is revered on this day. There is a also tradition of people buying jewelries, utensils and home appliances on this day. It is considered auspicious to buy gold or silver on this day.

Kukur Tihar (Day 2)

The second day is called Kukur (dog) Tihar, people do puja. On this day, all dogs, whether pets or strays, are offered treats and worshipped by placing a tika on their forehead and garlands of marigolds around their necks. This day marks the special relationship of human and dogs. At the gates of Svarga, Yudhishthira refuses to enter without the dog, who reveals himself to be the god Yama. Thus, the ancient bond between man and dog is established in the Mahabharata.

As mentioned in the Mahabharata, Bhairava, a fierce manifestation of Lord Shiva, had a dog as a vahana (vehicle). Yama, the god of death, is believed to own two guard dogs – each with four eyes. The dogs are said to watch over the gates of Naraka, the Hindu concept of Hell. Owing to this belief, this day is also observed as Naraka Chaturdashi.

Kukur Tihar has since acquired widespread popularity on the internet and in 2016, was even adopted by a Mexican animal rights group for a similar celebration in Mexico City.

Gai Tihar and Lakshmi Puja (Day 3)

The morning of the third day is called Gai (cow) Tihar. The cow is an especially important animal in Hinduism and is considered sacred. The cow is the vahana of the goddess of wealth Lakshmi and is thus also associated with prosperity. Hindus revere the cow as a particularly docile animal that gives a lot more than it takes. The cow produces milk, cheese, ghee, urine and dung. While the first three can be eaten, the urine is believed to have beneficial health effects and the dung is burned as fuel or used as fertilizer.Thus, on the third day of Tihar, Nepali Hindus people show their gratitude to the cow by feeding them treats and worshipping them with tikas and garlands.

The third day is also considered the most important day of the Tihar festival. Lakshmi, the patron goddess of the festival, is welcomed into homes that have been cleaned and the doorways and windows decorated with garlands made out of marigolds. Diyos are put up all around the home, especially in doorways and windowsills, while electric lights are draped over houses in the belief that the goddess will not visit dark homes. A special puja is offered to Lakshmi in the evening, wishing for wealth, prosperity and good health.

In the evening, young girls go around the neighbourhood, singing and dancing in a tradition called bhailo. They are offered small amounts of money and food as rewards for the entertainment they provide. Fireworks are also common on this particular day.

Govardhan Puja and Mha Puja (Day 4)
The fourth day of Tihar is Called as Goru puja, where the ox is worshipped and celebrated. The ox is seen as an analogue to the cow in Hinduism, as the ox provides manual labour, especially important for an agricultural country like Nepal. Vaishnav Hindus also perform Govardhan Puja, which is worship towards the holy Govardhan mountain. A pile of cow dung is taken as representative of the mountain and worshipped.

The fourth day of Tihar also generally coincides with the first day of the Nepal Sambat calendar and thus, is the celebratory Mha Puja for the Newar community, Mha Puja is a unique tradition where the self and the soul within is worshipped.

Bhai Tika (Day 5)

The fifth and last day of Tihar is called Bhai Tika. On this final day, which is celebrated with much fanfare across the country, brothers and sisters mark their special bond by worshipping each other. 

The legend goes that when the goddess Yamuna's brother fell mortally ill, Yama the god of death came to take his soul. Yamuna pleaded with the death god to wait until she had finished her final puja for her brother. She then embarked on a long elaborate ceremony that grew to include Yama. The Yamuna then asked Yama to not take away her brother until the tika on his forehead had faded, the oil she had sprinkled on him had dried and the Makhamali Ful Ko Mala (Gomphrena globosa) garlands she had put around his neck had wilted.

Thus, on the fifth day of Tihar, sisters create a protective barrier of holy water and blessed oil around their brothers, circumambulating them several times. A special garland made out of the makhamali flower (Gomphrena globosa) is placed around the brother's neck as this flower is known for its long life. The tika placed on the forehead of the brother is also unique in that it consists of seven different colours. The tika is also placed on the sister's forehead by the brother.

The ceremony is performed regardless of whether the brother is older or younger than the sister and first or second cousins are also eligible for the ceremony. In the end, the brother touches the feet of their sisters with their forehead, signifying love, respect and devotion. The brothers receive a variety of cooked food such as sel roti, fruits and packaged food while the sisters receive cash or other gifts such as clothing.

See also 

 Swanti, a similar festival celebrated by the Newar community of Nepal

References

Hindu festivals in Nepal
October observances
November observances
 Observances set by the Vikram Samvat calendar